Lexi Kay Zeiss (born November 4, 2005) is an American artistic gymnast and a member of the United States national gymnastics team.  She was part of the silver medal winning team at the 2022 Pan American Championships and was the alternate for the gold medal winning team at the 2022 World Championships.

Early life 
Zeiss was born in Omaha, Nebraska in 2005 to Jess and Dana Zeiss.

Gymnastics career

2021
Zeiss made her elite gymnastics debut at the 2021 Winter Cup where she placed eleventh in the all-around.  She next competed at the American Classic where she placed sixteenth.  Zeiss competed at the U.S. Classic where she finished sixteenth in the all-around.

2022 
Zeiss competed at the 2022 Winter Cup where she finished fifteenth in the all-around.

In July Zeiss was selected to compete at the Pan American Championships alongside Skye Blakely, Kayla DiCello, Zoe Miller, and Elle Mueller.  On the first day of competition Zeiss finished second in the all-around behind Flávia Saraiva of Brazil and third on balance beam behind Saraiva and Rebeca Andrade. During the team final Zeiss competed on vault, balance beam, and floor exercise, helping the United States win silver behind Brazil.  At the end of the competition Zeiss was awarded the Sportsmanship Award for Excellence, Respect, and Friendship by the Pan American Gymnastics Union alongside Caio Souza.

In August Zeiss competed at her first National Championships.  She finished seventh in the all-around and was named to the national team for the second time.

In October Zeiss announced her verbal commit to compete for the LSU Tigers gymnastics team.  Later that month she was selected as the traveling alternate for the 2022 World Championships team.  During the team final Zeiss was on the competition floor supporting the team as they won their sixth consecutive team gold medal.

2023 
Zeiss competed at the 2023 Winter Cup where she won the all-around competition.  As a result she was named to the team to compete at the DTB Pokal Team Challenge in Stuttgart alongside Nola Matthews, Zoe Miller, Joscelyn Roberson, and Ashlee Sullivan.

Competitive history

References

External links
 
 

2005 births
Living people
American female artistic gymnasts
U.S. women's national team gymnasts
Medalists at the World Artistic Gymnastics Championships
Sportspeople from Omaha, Nebraska
21st-century American women